is a private university in Higashinada, Kobe, Hyōgo, Japan. The predecessor of the school was founded in 1930, and it was chartered as a women's college in 1949. In 1994 the school became coeducational, adopting the present name.

External links
 Official website 

Educational institutions established in 1930
Private universities and colleges in Japan
Universities and colleges in Hyōgo Prefecture
1930 establishments in Japan